For the First Time is a 2008 Philippine romance film released by Star Cinema. It stars Richard Gutierrez and KC Concepcion. The film was shot mainly in the Philippines and Santorini, Greece.

Plot
For the First Time follows the lives of a couple from two worlds. Seth (Richard Gutierrez) is a rich, impulsive playboy who runs away from serious relationships and doesn't give much thought to the women he goes out with. Sophia (KC Concepcion) is a prude, ambitious girl who feels responsible for the tragedy she once encountered and with a scar to constantly remind her about this unfortunate experience.

When the two accidentally meet in Santorini, their differences did not stop them from spending one unforgettable summer together — that is until Seth runs away again, scared of the unusual feeling that is happening within him.

Seth soon realizes his mistake and comes back to Manila to try his best to regain Pia's affection. Conflicts in land ownership and businesses of their parents are now parts of a wall that is growing in between them.

Cast and characters

Main cast
 Richard Gutierrez as Seth Alexander Villaraza
 KC Concepcion as Sophia Carmina Sandoval

Supporting cast
 Jake Cuenca as Josh 
 Candy Pangilinan as Manang Josie
 Beatriz Saw as Selene
 Carla Humphries as Marianne
 Nor Domingo as Benjo
 Denise Laurel as Billie
 Phillip Salvador as Santiago Sandoval
 Geoff Eigenmann as Tristan
 Eddie Gutierrez as Hector Villaraza
 Pilar Pilapil as Sylvia Villaraza
 TJ Trinidad as Greg Sandoval
 Ana Roces as Abby Villaraza
 Bobby Andrews as Mike Villaraza
 Bruce Quebral as Migs
 Gee-Ann Abrahan as Michelle
 Bubbles Paraiso as Issa Villaraza

Awards

See also
 When I Met U

References

External links
 
 

2008 films
2008 romantic comedy films
Filipino-language films
2000s films
Star Cinema films
Philippine romantic comedy films
2008 multilingual films
Philippine multilingual films
Films directed by Joyce Bernal